Bonnie J. Buratti (born 1952) is an American planetary scientist in the Division of Earth and Space Sciences at the Jet Propulsion Laboratory in Pasadena, California, where she leads the Comets, Asteroids, and Satellites Group. Her research involves the composition and physical properties of planetary surfaces, and volatile transport in the outer solar system.

Education 
Buratti received an M.S. in Earth and Planetary sciences from the Massachusetts Institute of Technology and an M.S. and PhD in Astronomy and Space Sciences from Cornell University.

Career 
Buratti has worked on the Voyager Program, the Cassini–Huygens spacecraft (for which she served as Co-Investigator on the VIMS instrument), and the New Horizons space probe. For her work with the Cassini program she was awarded the NASA exceptional achievement medal in 2006. Buratti also does educational outreach at the college and grade school level. In 2014 she was elected Chair of the Division of Planetary Sciences of the American Astronomical Society. In November 2015, Buratti was named the NASA Project Scientist for the European Space Agency's Rosetta Mission to Comet 67P/Churyumov–Gerasimenko. She is a Fellow of the American Geophysical Union.

Awards and honors 
 The Hildian asteroid 90502 Buratti, discovered by NEAT in 2004, was named in her honor on 21 March 2008.
 In 2018, she was awarded the Carl Sagan Medal.

Bibliography

Books 
 Worlds Fantastic, Worlds Familiar: A Guided Tour of the Solar System

References
 

1952 births
Living people
American women astronomers
Women planetary scientists
Planetary scientists
Massachusetts Institute of Technology School of Science alumni
Cornell University alumni
Jet Propulsion Laboratory faculty
Place of birth missing (living people)
Fellows of the American Geophysical Union